Bouleternère is a commune in the Pyrénées-Orientales department in southern France.

Geography

Localisation 
Bouleternère is located in the canton of Le Canigou and in the arrondissement of Prades.

Hydrography 
Bouleternère is crossed by the Boulès river, a tributary of the Têt.

Government and politics

Mayors

Population

Sites of interest 

Part of the town's fortifications remain, and two of the four towers and three of the seven city doors are still in place.

The old Saint-Sulpitius church was built in the 11th century on the remains of an older church from the 9th century. A new Saint-Sulpitius church was built next to it and finished in 1659, while the old church became the presbytery. Both were hit by lightning in June 1891 and suffered a serious fire. They have since been repaired.

See also
Communes of the Pyrénées-Orientales department

References

Communes of Pyrénées-Orientales